Trillium vaseyi, the sweet wakerobin or sweet beth, is a spring flowering perennial plant which is found only in the southeastern United States, primarily in the southern part of the Appalachian Mountains but with a few populations farther south.

Sweet wakerobin has among the largest flowers in the trillium family, with red petals up to 7 cm long. It grows in rich woods, sometimes on riverbanks but other times on steep slopes.

References

Case, Frederick W. and Case, Roberta B. (1997) Trilliums.

External links 
 
 

vaseyi
Endemic flora of the United States
Flora of the Southeastern United States
Plants described in 1902
Least concern flora of the United States